Ville Viitaluoma (born February 16, 1981) is a Finnish professional ice hockey forward who currently plays for Vaasan Sport of the SM-liiga.

References

External links

Living people
Espoo Blues players
HPK players
Vaasan Sport players
1981 births
Finnish ice hockey centres
Sportspeople from Espoo